The 1976 United States presidential election in Hawaii took place on November 2, 1976. All fifty states and the District of Columbia were part of the 1976 United States presidential election. Hawaii voters chose four electors to the Electoral College, who voted for president and vice president.

Hawaii was won by Georgia Governor Jimmy Carter by 2.53 points, making Hawaii 0.43% more Democratic than the nation-at-large. It was the only postbellum state won by Carter: since William McKinley in 1896 no other candidate has won the presidency while winning so few as one postbellum state. In fact, Carter did not win any other state fully west of the hundredth meridian, including the Pacific states of Oregon and California admitted before the civil war.

Results

Results by county

Notes

References

Hawaii
1976
1976 Hawaii elections